New Love is the second album from experimental electronic group Former Ghosts, a collaborative effort between Jamie Stewart (Xiu Xiu), Freddy Ruppert (This Song is a Mess But So Am I), Yasmine Kittles (TEARIST) and Nika Roza Danilova (Zola Jesus).

Track listing
 "The Days Will Get Long Again"
 "Winter's Year"
 "New Orleans"
 "Until You Are Alone Again"
 "Chin Up"
 "And When You Kiss Me"
 "Taurean Nature"
 "Trust"
 "Right Here"
 "I Am Not What You Want"
 "Only in Time"
 "Bare Bones"
 "New Love"

References

2010 albums